Maria of Serbia or Marija Branković (b. 1466 - d. 27 August 1495) was Princess of Serbia by birth, and Marchioness of Montferrat by marriage. She was regent of Montferrat during the minority of her son in 1494-1495.

She was daughter of despot Stefan Branković of Serbia and Angelina, despotess of Serbia. In 1485, she married Boniface III, Marquess of Montferrat.

Biography
Since 1459, when Serbia fell under Ottoman rule, Maria′s father, Despot Stefan Branković, was living in exile, mainly in northern Italy, where Maria was born in 1466. In 1485, she was married to Boniface III Palaiologos, marquess of Montferrat, who fell ill in 1493, and Maria became regent. Boniface died in 1494, and his widow continued to act as regent since their sons were still minor. Maria died in 1495. 

Maria and Boniface had two sons: William IX (1486-1518), who became Marquess of Montferrat between 1494 and 1518, and John George (1488-1533) who became the last Marquess of Montferrat, between 1530 and 1533.

References

Sources

Ancestry

1466 births
1495 deaths
Branković dynasty
Marchionesses of Montferrat
15th-century women rulers